Oxyophthalmellus rehni is a species of praying mantis found in Kenya and Somalia.

See also
List of mantis genera and species

References

Tarachodidae
Mantodea of Africa
Insects described in 1952